Dennis Dean Werth (born December 29, 1952) is a former Major League Baseball catcher, first baseman and outfielder.

Career
Werth is an alumnus of Southern Illinois University Edwardsville and Lincoln College.  Drafted by the New York Yankees in the 19th round of the 1974 Major League Baseball Draft, Werth made his Major League debut with the New York Yankees on September 17, 1979, and appeared in his final game on September 27, 1982. During the baseball strike in 1981, Werth played for the Columbus Clippers.  He was signed by Yankees scout Lou Maguolo. He was traded from the Yankees to the Royals for minor-league right-handed pitcher Scot Beahan during spring training on March 24, 1982.

Personal
Werth is the stepfather of former Washington Nationals outfielder Jayson Werth, and the husband of former U.S. Olympic athlete Kim Schofield Werth.

References

External links

Baseball players from Illinois
1952 births
Living people
New York Yankees players
Kansas City Royals players
Major League Baseball outfielders
Major League Baseball first basemen
Nashville Sounds players
Columbus Clippers players
Oneonta Yankees players
Fort Lauderdale Yankees players
West Haven Yankees players
SIU Edwardsville Cougars baseball players
Syracuse Chiefs players
Tacoma Yankees players
Omaha Royals players
Louisville Redbirds players
People from Lincoln, Illinois